"We'll Meet Again" is a 1939 song made famous by Vera Lynn.

We'll Meet Again may also refer to:

Film and television
 We'll Meet Again (1943 film), a musical starring Lynn
 We'll Meet Again, a 1999 story by Mary Higgins Clark
 We'll Meet Again (2002 film), a film based on the story
 We'll Meet Again (TV series), a 1982 British television series
 We'll Meet Again with Ann Curry, a 2017–18 PBS television series
 "We'll Meet Again" (True Blood), an episode of True Blood

Music
 We'll Meet Again: The Very Best of Vera Lynn, a 2009 compilation album
 We Will Meet Again, an album by Bill Evans
 "We'll Meet Again", a song by Pantera from Power Metal
"We'll Meet Again", a song by TheFatRat

See also
 Till We Meet Again (disambiguation)